is a Japanese film actor. He is most famous for playing villains. Before he started his acting career, he was a professional baseball player of Toei Flyer's. 

In 1956, he joined Toei Flyer's but in 1958, he retired because of an injury. He joined Toei film company and made his film debut in 1959. He debuted as a director with his film  Dagashiya Koharu in 2018.

Selected filmography

Film
 The Proud Challenge (1962)
 Gang vs. G-Men (1962)
 Wolves, Pigs and Men (1964) : Bagman
 A Fugitive from the Past (1965) : Machida
 Soshiki Bōryoku series (1967–69) : Tetsu
 Abashiri Prison film series (1965-1972)
 Gendai Yakuza: Yotamono Jingi (1969) : Itō
 Bloodstained Clan Honor (1970) : Yabuki
 Street Mobster (1972) : Karasawa
 Female Convict Scorpion: Beast Stable (1973) : Adachi
 Battles Without Honor and Humanity: Deadly Fight in Hiroshima (1973) : Asano
 Battles Without Honor and Humanity: Proxy War (1974) : Kawanishi
 Battles Without Honor and Humanity: Final Episode (1974) : Ryosuke Kaga
 New Battles Without Honor and Humanity (1974) : Susumu Kudo
 New Battles Without Honor and Humanity: The Boss's Head (1975) : Miyai
 New Battles Without Honor and Humanity: The Boss's Last Days (1975) : Tsurukichi Nemoto
 Yakuza Graveyard (1976) : Ezaki
 Doraemon: Nobita's Little Star Wars (1985) : General Gilmore (Voice)
 The Triple Cross (1992)
 Ghost Pub (1994) : Uohara
 Ambition Without Honor (1996)
 Minna no Ie (2001) : Arakawa Jr.
 Dagashiya Koharu (2018)

Television
 Kikaider 01 (1973–74) as Big Shadow
 Himitsu Sentai Gorenger (1976–77) as Black cross Führer
 Uchi no Ko ni Kagitte... (1984) as Nobuyuki Fukami
 Dokuganryū Masamune (1987) as Munefuyu Murata

References

External links

1935 births
Japanese male film actors
Living people